In Norse mythology, Glenr (Old Norse" , "opening in the clouds") is the husband of the goddess Sól, who drives the horses of the sun across the sky.

Glenr is also an alternate name for Glær, one of the horses listed among those ridden by the gods, according to Gylfaginning.

Notes

References
Simek, Rudolf (2007) translated by Angela Hall. Dictionary of Northern Mythology. D.S. Brewer. 

Norse gods